Leonard Henly Sims (February 6, 1807 – February 28, 1886) was a U.S. Representative from Missouri.

Born in Burke County, North Carolina, Sims received a limited schooling. He moved to Rutherford County, Tennessee, in 1830 and engaged in agricultural pursuits. He served as member of the Tennessee House of Representatives for two terms. He settled near Springfield, Missouri, in 1839 and continued agricultural pursuits. He served as member of the Missouri State house of representatives 1842–1846.

Sims was elected as a Democrat to the Twenty-ninth Congress (March 4, 1845 – March 3, 1847). He returned to Rutherford County, Tennessee, in 1847 and continued farming. He moved to Independence County, Arkansas, in 1859, settled on a farm near Batesville, and engaged in cotton raising and farming. He served in the Arkansas State Senate from 1866 to 1870 and 1874 to 1878. He died on his plantation near Batesville, Arkansas, February 28, 1886. He was interred in the family plot on his farm.

References
Library of Congress
Kipnotes

1807 births
1886 deaths
Democratic Party members of the Tennessee House of Representatives
Members of the Missouri House of Representatives
Democratic Party members of the United States House of Representatives from Missouri
Arkansas Democrats
Arkansas state senators
19th-century American politicians